WLFE (90.9 FM) is a radio station broadcasting a Contemporary Christian format that launched on March 1, 2010. Licensed to Cutler Bay, Florida, United States, the station serves Miami-Dade County and the upper Florida Keys.  The station is operated by Calvary Chapel Kendall.

From 1980 until 2010 the WLFE call letters were on a country music station that was broadcast out of Saint Albans, Vermont.

References

External links

90.9 Life FM
Calvary Chapel Kendall

Radio stations established in 1995
1995 establishments in Florida
LFE